Hardanger Sunnhordlandske Dampskipsselskap (HSD), founded in 1880, was one of Norway's largest privately held public transportation providers. Its bus operation HSD Buss AS was founded in 1999, and serviced 15 million passengers annually in large parts of western Norway, predominantly in Vestland. It also had a ferry service, HSD Sjø AS, transporting passengers along the west coast of Norway. The fleet consisted of 31 ferries and 10 catamarans as of 2006.

In 2006 the company merged with Gaia Trafikk forming the new company Tide.

Vessels
Some of the vessels owned and operated by HSD.

  (1913)
  (1931)
 MS Sunnhordland (1947)
 MS Stord (1970)
 MS Tysnes (1970)
  (1999)

References

Defunct bus companies of Norway
Companies formerly listed on the Oslo Stock Exchange
Bus companies of Vestland
Ferry companies of Vestland
Companies established in 1880
Companies disestablished in 2006
1880 establishments in Norway
2006 disestablishments in Norway
Logistics companies of Norway